Tremor de Arriba is a locality and minor local entity located in the municipality of Igüeña, in León province, Castile and León, Spain. As of 2020, it has a population of 324.

Geography 
Tremor de Arriba is located 96km west-northwest of León, Spain.

References

Populated places in the Province of León